Inga Kichwa is a dialect of Kichwa spoken in the Colombian Putumayo region by the Inga people. There are two dialects: Highland Inga, spoken in the Sibundoy valley; and Jungle Inga, spoken on the Putumayo and Japurá Rivers. Ethnologue reports Highland Inga is partially intelligible with Imbabura Kichwa.

References

External links
 Roger Parks: The Historical-Comparative Classification of Colombian Inga (Quechua) (PDF) 
 Comité de Educación Inga de la Organización "Musu Runakuna", Diccionario Inga (edición interine en el nuevo alfabeto). Borrador de septiembre 1997 (PDF) 

Languages of Colombia
Quechuan languages